Byram is a neighborhood/section and census-designated place (CDP) in the town of Greenwich in Fairfield County, Connecticut, United States. It had a population of 4,146 at the 2010 census, and a census-estimated population of 4,216 in 2018. An endcap of Connecticut's Gold Coast, Byram is the southernmost point in the town of Greenwich and the U.S. state of Connecticut. It is separated from Port Chester, Westchester County, New York, by the Byram River. Byram was once known as East Port Chester.

History
The town of Greenwich is one political and taxing body, but consists of several distinct sections or neighborhoods, such as Banksville, Byram, Cos Cob, Glenville, Mianus, Old Greenwich, Riverside and Greenwich (sometimes referred to as central, or downtown, Greenwich). Of these neighborhoods, three (Cos Cob, Old Greenwich, and Riverside) have separate postal names and ZIP codes.

Byram Quarry, now closed, supplied stone for the Brooklyn Bridge, the base of the Statue of Liberty and St. Roch Church.

Geography

Culture
A scene from the movie The Good Shepherd was shot in Byram.

Places
Byram has three sites on the National Register of Historic Places:
 Phebe Seaman House (1794), 170 Byram Road; built c. 1794
 Thomas Lyon House — 1 Byram Road; built: c. 1695, listed: 1977
 Byram School — Western Junior Highway; built: 1925, listed: 1990

Library
Byram Shubert Library

Notes

Neighborhoods in Connecticut
Greenwich, Connecticut
Census-designated places in Fairfield County, Connecticut
Census-designated places in Connecticut